Siege of Itami may refer to:

 Siege of Itami (1574)
 Siege of Itami (1579)